Tao Hong (born 11 May 1969), also known as Helen Tao, is a Chinese actress and singer. She received the 2002 Golden Rooster Award for Best Actress.

Filmography

Film

TV Dramas

References

External links
 

1969 births
Living people
Actresses from Chongqing
20th-century Chinese actresses
21st-century Chinese actresses
Chinese stage actresses
Central Academy of Drama alumni
Chinese film actresses
Chinese television actresses